Daddy Bug is an album by American jazz vibraphonist Roy Ayers released on the Atlantic label in 1969. Several tracks from the album were re-released without string and woodwind overdubs on Daddy Bug & Friends in 1976.

Track listing
 "Daddy Bug" (Roy Ayers) - 3:08
 "Bonita" (Antônio Carlos Jobim, Ray Gilbert) - 2:51
 "This Guy's in Love with You" (Burt Bacharach, Hal David) - 4:49
 "I Love You Michelle" (Edwin Birdsong) - 4:50
 "Shadows" (Buster Williams) - 3:43
 "Emmie" (Laura Nyro) - 4:14
 "Look to the Sky" (Jobim) - 4:56
 "It Could Only Happen with You" (Jobim, Gilbert, Louis Oliveira) - 2:53
Recorded at Atlantic Studios and A & R Studios in NYC on March 11, 1969 (tracks 3, 4 & 7), May 12, 1969 (tracks 1, 2, 5 & 8) and August 13, 1969 (track 6) with overdubbed woodwinds and strings recorded on July 21, 1969 (tracks 1, 3-5, 7 & 8)

Personnel 
Roy Ayers - vibraphone
Herbie Hancock - piano
Sonny Sharrock - guitar (track 6)
Ron Carter (tracks 3, 4, 6 & 7), Buster Williams (tracks 1, 2, 5 & 8) - bass
Bruno Carr (track 6), Freddie Waits (tracks 3, 4 & 7), Mickey Roker (tracks 1, 2, 5 & 8)  - drums
Hubert Laws - flute, bass flute (tracks 1, 3-5 & 7) 
George Marge, Romeo Penque, Jerome Richardson - soprano saxophone, bass clarinet (tracks 1, 3-5 & 7) 
Bill Fischer - arranger, conductor (tracks 1-5, 7 & 8) 
Alfred Brown, Kermit Moore, George Ricci - cello (tracks 1, 5 & 8)
Gene Orloff - string director (tracks 1, 5 & 8)

References 

1969 albums
Roy Ayers albums
Atlantic Records albums